Petracola angustisoma is a species of lizard in the family Gymnophthalmidae. It is endemic to Peru.

References

Petracola
Reptiles of Peru
Endemic fauna of Peru
Reptiles described in 2015
Taxa named by Lourdes Y. Echevarría
Taxa named by Pablo J. Venegas